The 2004 Oklahoma Sooners football team represented the University of Oklahoma during the 2004 NCAA Division I-A football season, the 110th season of Sooner football. The team was led by two-time Walter Camp Coach of the Year Award winner, Bob Stoops, in his sixth season as head coach. They played their home games at Gaylord Family Oklahoma Memorial Stadium in Norman, Oklahoma. They were a charter member of the Big 12 Conference.

Conference play began with a win over the Texas Tech Red Raiders in Norman on October 2, and ended with a win over the Colorado Buffaloes in the Big 12 Championship Game on December 4. The Sooners finished the regular season 12–0 (9–0 in Big 12) while winning their third Big 12 title and their 39th conference title overall. They were invited to the 2005 Orange Bowl, which served as the BCS National Championship Game that year.

Following the season, Jammal Brown was selected 13th overall and Mark Clayton 22nd in the 2005 NFL Draft, along with Brodney Pool, Mark Bradley and Dan Cody in the 2nd round, Brandon Jones in the 3rd, Antonio Perkins in the 4th, Donte Nicholson, Mike Hawkins and Lance Mitchell in the 5th, and Wes Sims in the 6th. This total number of 11 stands as the most Sooners taken in the NFL Draft in the 16 years of the Stoops era.

Schedule

Roster

Coaching staff

Source:

Game summaries

Bowling Green

Houston

Oregon

Source: 
    
    
    
    
    
    

Statistics
OKLA: Adrian Peterson 24 Rush, 183 Yds

Texas Tech

Texas

Kansas State

Kansas

Oklahoma State

Texas A&M

Nebraska

Baylor

Colorado (Big 12 Championship Game)

USC (Orange Bowl)

Statistics

Team

Scores by quarter

Rankings

2005 NFL draft

The 2005 NFL Draft was held on April 23–24, 2005, at the Jacob K. Javits Convention Center in New York City. The following Oklahoma players were either selected or signed as undrafted free agents following the draft.

References

Oklahoma
Oklahoma Sooners football seasons
Big 12 Conference football champion seasons
Oklahoma Sooners football